Benedetto Rusconi, nicknamed the Diana, (ca. 1460 – 1525) was an Italian Renaissance painter, a companion of Vittore Carpaccio and Giovanni di Niccolò Mansueti, who lived in the latter part of the 15th and early part of the 16th centuries. No date can be given of his birth.

He was an inferior artist, and worked both in tempera and oils. A number of his paintings are in Venice. He painted The Brethren distributing Alms, in San Giovanni Evangelista, Venice, and he assisted Lazzaro Bastiani in painting the standards on the Piazza of San Marco. In the Accademia Gallery are included his Virgin and Child, formerly in Santa Lucia at Padua, and a Transfiguration. The church of Santa Maria della Croce in Crema has an altarpiece depicting the Gift of the Miraculous Girdle to St Thomas. A Madonna and Child With St Jerome is on display at the Lowe Art Museum in Coral Gables, Florida.

Sources

References

External links

Benedetto Diana on Artcyclopedia

Year of birth unknown
1525 deaths
Italian Renaissance painters
16th-century Italian painters
Italian male painters
Painters from Venice